The 1969–70 English football season was Aston Villa's 70th season in the Football League, this season playing in the Football League Second Division. On 19 January 1970, with Villa bottom of the Second Division, manager Tommy Docherty was sacked. Vic Crowe was subsequently appointed manager.

Bruce Rioch moved to Aston Villa in July 1969 for a fee of £100,000, then a record fee paid by a Second Division side.

Tommy Docherty, then Manager saw two Zambians, Emment Kapengwe and Freddie Mwila in action and signed them on. They arrived in Birmingham in August 1969 and signed for Villa for two years. There, they met Brian Tiler who would later coach the Zambian national team. Kapengwe made three football league appearances and Mwila featured only once, becoming the second and third black players to play for Villa since Willie Clarke in 1901. Unfortunately, results were not very good and Villa were relegated to the third division. Docherty left the team and the duo decided to come back home after 9 months with Villa.

Second Division

References

External links
AVFC History: 1969-70 season

Aston Villa F.C. seasons
Aston Villa F.C. season